James Lee Newberry (June 9, 1919 – June 23, 1983), nicknamed "Schoolboy", was an American pitcher in the Negro leagues and in the Japanese Pacific League.

Newberry played professionally from 1944 to 1956, playing with the Cincinnati Clowns, Birmingham Black Barons of the Negro American League and Hankyu Braves. While with the Barons, Newberry was a teammate of Willie Mays in the late '40s. Piper Davis, the manager, had most of the players take turns watching out for the young Mays—except for Newberry and Alonzo Perry. "No one knew what they would get into after a game. They liked the ladies and they liked their beer," Mays said. Newberry and John Britton were the first African-Americans to play on a Japanese baseball team. He played in the minor leagues from 1954 to 1956. Newberry died in June 1983 in Cook County, Illinois at the age of 64.

See also 
 American expatriate baseball players in Japan

References

External links
 and Baseball-Reference Black Baseball and minor league stats and Seamheads
 Jimmy Newberry at SABR Biography Project

1919 births
1983 deaths
People from Camden, Alabama
American expatriate baseball players in Japan
Birmingham Black Barons players
Cincinnati Clowns players
El Paso Texans players
Hankyu Braves players
Abilene Blue Sox players
Port Arthur Sea Hawks players
Amarillo Gold Sox players
Baseball players from Alabama
20th-century African-American sportspeople
Baseball pitchers